The House on the Rock is a tourist attraction in Wisconsin, United States.

House on the Rock may also refer to:
 "House on the Rock" (American Gods), an episode of the television series American Gods
 House on the Rock (church), in Lagos, Nigeria
 House on the Rock (Sighișoara), an historic building in Romania
 Parable of the Wise and the Foolish Builders, a parable of Jesus